Mykland may refer to:

People
Erik Mykland (born 1971), a former Norwegian footballer known as "Myggen" ("the Mosquito")
Thor-Eirik Gulbrandsen Mykland (1940–2014), a Norwegian politician for the Labour Party

Places
Mykland (municipality), a former municipality in Aust-Agder county, Norway
Mykland (village), a village in Froland municipality in Aust-Agder county, Norway
Mykland Church, a church in Froland municipality in Aust-Agder county, Norway